Susan Buckner is an American former actress. Prior to her acting career she was crowned Miss Washington in 1971 and in September went on to become a top ten finalist in the Miss America 1972 pageant (she tied for first in the swimsuit preliminary), which was eventually won by Miss Ohio Laurel Lea Schaefer. Her acting career is sprinkled with supporting roles in television, stage, and film. Susan is probably best remembered for her role as high school cheerleader Patty Simcox in the 1978 summer blockbuster Grease, starring Olivia Newton-John and John Travolta. She also appeared as one of The Krofftettes who performed synchronized swimming routines on The Brady Bunch Variety Hour. The most recent appearance of Buckner was on an episode of 1 vs. 100 as a mob member.

Filmography

Film

Television

See also 
Grease
The Krofftettes
Brady Bunch Hour

External links 

 
Miss Washington Official Website
TV Guide 1 vs 100 Celebrity Photos - Episode 13 - Jan 14, 2007

Living people
Actresses from Washington (state)
American film actresses
American television actresses
Miss America 1970s delegates
Miss America Preliminary Swimsuit winners
20th-century American actresses
21st-century American women
Year of birth missing (living people)